David Sidney Reid (January 11, 1934 – June 8, 2021) was a Canadian professional ice hockey player. He played seven games in the National Hockey League, over three seasons (1952–53 to 1955–56), with the Toronto Maple Leafs.

Career statistics

Regular season and playoffs

References

External links
 

1934 births
2021 deaths
Canadian ice hockey centres
Ice hockey people from Toronto
Hull-Ottawa Canadiens players
Toronto Maple Leafs players
Toronto Marlboros players
Toronto Varsity Blues ice hockey players